Air-to-ground weaponry is aircraft ordnance used by combat aircraft to attack ground targets. The weapons include bombs, machine guns, autocannons, air-to-surface missiles, rockets, air-launched cruise missiles and grenade launchers.

See also
 Aircraft ordnance
 Attack aircraft
 Gunship
 Close air support

Aircraft weapons